1754 Cunningham, provisional designation , is a Hildian asteroid from the outermost region of the asteroid belt, approximately 80 kilometers in diameter.

It was discovered on 29 March 1935, by Belgian astronomer Eugène Delporte at the Royal Observatory of Belgium in Uccle. It was later named after American astronomer Leland Cunningham.

Orbit and classification 

Cunningham is a dark and reddish asteroid and member of the Hilda family, a large group that orbits in resonance with the gas giant Jupiter and are thought to originate from the Kuiper belt. It orbits the Sun in the outermost main-belt at a distance of 3.3–4.6 AU once every 7 years and 10 months (2,859 days). Its orbit has an eccentricity of 0.17 and an inclination of 12° with respect to the ecliptic.

Physical characteristics

Rotation period 

In July 2015, a rotational lightcurve of Cunningham was obtained from photometric observation by American amateur astronomer Robert Stephens at the Center for Solar System Studies in California. It gave a well-defined rotation period of 7.7416 hours with a brightness variation of 0.17 magnitude.

A similar period of 7.7398 hours with an amplitude of 0.16 was previously obtained by French and Italian amateur astronomers Pierre Antonini and Silvano Casulli in July 2008. Other lightcurves gave a shorter period of 4.285 and 5.16 hours.

Diameter and albedo 

According to the surveys carried out by the Infrared Astronomical Satellite IRAS and the Japanese Akari satellite, Cunningham measures 79.52 and 83.55 kilometers in diameter, and its surface has an albedo of 0.035 and 0.031, respectively. The Collaborative Asteroid Lightcurve Link agrees with the results found by IRAS, that is an albedo of 0.035 and a diameter of 79.52 kilometers with on an absolute magnitude of 9.77. Cunningham belongs to a small group asteroids with a spectral P-type in the Tholen classification scheme.

Naming 

This minor planet was named in honor of American astronomer Leland Cunningham (1904–1989), who began his career as an assistant to astronomer Fred Whipple (also see 1940 Whipple) at Harvard University in the 1930s and worked at the Leuschner Observatory of University of California during the 1940s and 1950s. The official  was published by the Minor Planet Center on 20 February 1976. Cunningham discovered four minor planets himself and was a prolific computer of cometary orbits and observer of faint comets, including comet Gale, a lost comet he recovered in 1938.

Notes

References

External links 
 Asteroid Lightcurve Database (LCDB), query form (info )
 Dictionary of Minor Planet Names, Google books
 Asteroids and comets rotation curves, CdR – Observatoire de Genève, Raoul Behrend
 Discovery Circumstances: Numbered Minor Planets (1)-(5000)  – Minor Planet Center
 
 

001754
Discoveries by Eugène Joseph Delporte
Named minor planets
001754
19350329